Valentín Rocandio Cilveti (born 29 June 1963) is a Spanish sprinter. He competed in the men's 4 × 100 metres relay at the 1988 Summer Olympics.

References

1963 births
Living people
Athletes (track and field) at the 1988 Summer Olympics
Spanish male sprinters
Olympic athletes of Spain
Sportspeople from San Sebastián
Athletes from the Basque Country (autonomous community)